Tegillarca is a genus of molluscs of the  family Arcidae, the Ark clams.

Species
Species of this genus include:
 Tegillarca addita (Iredale, 1939)
 Tegillarca aequilatera (Dunker, 1868)
 Tegillarca bicors  (Jonas in Philippi, 1845)
 Tegillarca disessa (Iredale, 1939)
 Tegillarca granosa (Linnaeus, 1758)
 Tegillarca nodifera (E. von Martens, 1860)
 Tegillarca rhombea (Born, 1778) 
 Tegillarca zanzibarensis  (Nyst, 1848)

References

External links
 Mörch, O. A. L. (1852-1853). Catalogus conchyliorum quae reliquit D. Alphonso d'Aguirra & Gadea Comes de Yoldi, Regis Daniae Cubiculariorum Princeps, Ordinis Dannebrogici in Prima Classe & Ordinis Caroli Tertii Eques. Fasc. 1, Cephalophora, 170 pp. (1852); Fasc. 2, Acephala, Annulata, Cirripedia, Echinodermata, 74 (+2) pp. (1853). Hafniae
 Iredale, T. (1939). Mollusca. Part I. Scientific Reports of the Great Barrier Reef Expedition 1928-1929. 5(6): 209-425, pls 1-7

 
Bivalve genera